The second season of Drop Dead Diva premiered on June 6, 2010 and concluded August 29, 2010 on Lifetime. Season two aired on Sundays at 8:00 pm ET for the entire season and consisted of 13 episodes.

Storylines

Jane/Deb & Grayson
In the second season Deb learns that Jane only married Ethan so he could get insurance for cancer treatments, only for him to leave a month after they were married. Deb channels Jane's reactions upon learning she wants the divorce because he was a jerk for leaving her. This turn of events have Deb starting to act more like Jane as she starts to take on Jane's emotions and feelings. Meanwhile, Parker, with secret help from Grayson, also saved Jane's job after Tony, who was upset upon learning that she was married, refused to represent her after initially agreeing to do it. Deb/Jane would later learn from Fred that Kim did sleep with Grayson, resulting in Kim's pregnancy scare, devastating Deb for a moment until Fred told her the results came back negative.

She also resumed her relationship with Tony after their brief break-up. When things finally seem to be going great in their relationship, Tony informs her that he has received a new job in Washington D.C. He then asks Jane to move with him but she sadly informs him that her life belongs with the firm and Stacy. After Tony moved away, Jane seemed to resume her romantic feelings for Grayson again. When she heard that Grayson broke up with Vanessa in the season finale, and then he asked her to dinner consecutively she thought he may finally be reciprocating those feelings. She then made up her mind to tell him the truth about her being Deb. Fred warned her not to go to the dinner as something bad would happen but she ignored him as her mind was set. At dinner, Grayson told Jane that he did not want to lose a second opportunity to have a great woman in his life and that he was going to propose to Vanessa that night. He also asked Jane to be his best man. This upset her tremendously and she stomped out of the restaurant angrily passing Vanessa on the way. Grayson completely baffled by her behaviour ran out of the restaurant and called out to her in the street but then he got hit by a van. Jane screamed as he flew in the air, Vanessa came out and witnessed the horrific scene while Fred looked on gravely. Jane then screamed at Fred, ran to Grayson now lying in a pool of blood and he smiled at her and said "Deb" before closing his eyes.

Kim & Parker
Kim testifies against Jane in her disbarment hearing but Parker defends Jane in the case and wins. During the second season, Parker and Kim start to work more closely and begin a relationship, which is tested when Parker's former partner, Claire Harrison, returns to the firm. Claire butts heads with Kim, which causes Claire to fire Kim and Kim to think that Parker is sleeping with Claire. Parker later fires Claire and attempts to hire Kim back but to no avail.

Fred & Stacy
Kim hires Fred as her new assistant and Fred tries to get closer to Stacy by helping her get some jobs. Stacy attempts to create "The Armvelope," a sleeve-like accessory that can be used during driving until she receives a cease & desist letter from a Japanese company that already produces such a product. Fred attempts to get Stacy back by trying to make her jealous but it doesn't work. Later in the season, Fred and Stacy resume their past relationship and he tells her he loves her. Fred is jealous when Stacy books a commercial and has to kiss her pretend husband.

Cast

Main cast
 Brooke Elliott as Jane Bingum (13 episodes)
 Margaret Cho as Teri Lee (13 episodes)
 April Bowlby as Stacy Barrett (13 episodes)
 Kate Levering as Kim Kaswell (13 episodes)
 Jackson Hurst as Grayson Kent (13 episodes)
 Josh Stamberg as Jay Parker (13 episodes)
 Ben Feldman as Fred (13 episodes)

Recurring cast
 Jaime Ray Newman as Vanessa Hemmings (6 episodes)
 David Denman as Tony Nicastro (4 episodes)
 Jeff Rose as Doug Resnick (4 episodes)
 Gregory Alan Williams as Judge Warren Libby (3 episodes)
 Brooke D'Orsay as Deb Dobkins (3 episodes)
 Vickie Eng as Judge Rita Mayson (3 episodes)

Guest cast
 Paula Abdul as Judge Paula Abdul (2 episodes)
 Rhoda Griffis as Paula Dewey (2 episodes)
 Marcus Lyle Brown as A.D.A. Paul Saginaw (2 episodes)
 Rosie O'Donnell as Judge Madeline Summers (2 episodes)
 Natasha Henstridge as Claire Harrison (2 episodes)
 Skyler Day as Lana Dooley (1 episode)
 Sharon Lawrence as Bobbi Dobkins (1 episode)
 Faith Prince as Elaine Bingum (1 episode)
 Leisha Hailey as Hope Prentiss (1 episode)
 Jasmine Guy as Judge Nona Daniels (1 episode)

Episodes

DVD release

References

External links
 Drop Dead Diva on Lifetime
 

2010 American television seasons